The 2009–10 season was the 130th season of competitive football by Rangers.

Overview
Rangers played a total of 54 competitive matches during the 2009–10 season. A quiet summer in terms of transfer arrivals contrasted to the outgoings. The club removed eleven players who had made first team appearances from the wage bill on permanent and loan deals. The only addition to the playing staff was Jérôme Rothen on a season loan, Rothen was the first player to sign for the club in over a year. On 26 August, chairman David Murray stepped down and was replaced by non-executive director Alastair Johnston. Johnston stated that one of his main priorities was to find a buyer for owner Murray's shares. On 24 October, Rangers manager Walter Smith was reported to say that Lloyds Banking Group, who the club was in debt to, was "effectively running the club". On 12 November, the extent of the club's financial problems was shown to be £31m in debt, a rise of £10m from the previous year.

On the field, Rangers' Scottish Premier League title defence got off to a stuttering start, three wins in the league was followed by three draws, the first Old Firm victory of the season was followed by poor performances against St Johnstone and dropped points at home to Hibernian. The side lost their first league match of the season away to Aberdeen on 28 November but then embarked on a six-match winning run, scoring 26 goals in the process. At the start of 2010, Rangers sat at the top of the league. The second Old Firm fixture finished in a 1–1 draw. Rangers had a ten-point lead by mid February. Rangers won the third Old Firm match 1-0 thanks to an injury time winner from Maurice Edu which all but secured the title. The side had to wait nearly two months to be confirmed as champions due to dropping points to St Johnstone and Dundee United. On 25 April Rangers won their 53rd league title after defeating Hibernian 1–0 at Easter Road, with Kyle Lafferty scoring the only goal.

In the domestic cup competitions, Rangers won the League Cup after a 1–0 victory over St Mirren in the final, despite being reduced to nine men with Danny Wilson and Kevin Thomson being sent-off. However, Rangers were unable to retain the Scottish Cup after losing 1–0 to eventual winners Dundee United in a quarter-final replay.

Rangers were seeded in pot two of the UEFA Champions League group stage for the first time. The club was drawn against Spanish team Sevilla, German outfit VfB Stuttgart and Romanian champions Unirea Urziceni. A 1–1 away draw in Germany was followed by two consecutive 4–1 defeats at home to Sevilla and Unirea, the latter being regarded as one of the club's worst ever European results. Rangers were left with a small chance of qualifying from the group after a 1–1 draw in the return leg with Unirea, a match that saw trouble in the Rangers fans section of the stadium; the club was later charged by UEFA for inappropriate conduct and following an investigation fined €20,000 plus ordered to pay the cost of repairing the damage to the stadium infrastructure caused by its supporters. The side finished bottom of their group and was knocked out of European football altogether after two defeats from in the final two matches.

Players

Squad information

Transfers

In

Total spending: £0

Out

Total income: £4,350,000

Squad statistics

Goal scorers

Last updated: 9 May 2010
Source: Match reports
Only competitive matches

Disciplinary record

Last updated: 9 May 2010
Source: Match reports
Only competitive matches

Club

Board of directors

Coaching staff

Other staff

Matches

Scottish Premier League

UEFA Champions League

Scottish Cup

League Cup

Friendlies

Competitions

Overall

Scottish Premier League

Standings

Results summary

Results by round

UEFA Champions League

Group G

References 

Rangers F.C. seasons
Rangers
Scottish football championship-winning seasons